The Breast is a peer-reviewed medical journal published by Elsevier covering research on breast cancer. It is an associate journal of the Australasian Society for Breast Disease

External links 
 
 Australasian Society for Breast Disease

Oncology journals
English-language journals
Elsevier academic journals
Bimonthly journals
Publications established in 1992